Luis Eduardo Lugo Lareschi (born March 5, 1994) is a Venezuelan-born Italian professional baseball pitcher who is a free agent. Lugo was signed by the Cleveland Indians as an undrafted free agent in 2011. He played for Team Italy in the 2019 European Baseball Championship.

Professional career
Lugo was signed by the Cleveland Indians as an undrafted free agent on February 28, 2011. He began his professional career in 2011, appearing in 12 games between the Dominican Summer League Indians and the Arizona League Indians with an 0–5 record and a 3.93 ERA. The following season he spent entirely in Arizona, and then in 2013 he played for the Mahoning Valley Scrappers, starting 11 games with a 1–4 record and a 1.97 ERA. He was selected to the mid-season all-star team that year.  He spent 2014 with the Lake County Captains and 2015 and 2016 with the Lynchburg Hillcats.

On December 1, 2017, Lugo signed a minor league contract with the Baltimore Orioles. He was released on March 30, 2018.

On May 3, 2018, Lugo signed with the Parmaclima Parma of the Italian Baseball League.

On July 23, 2018, Lugo signed a minor league contract with the Kansas City Royals. During the 2018 Winter Meetings, the Chicago Cubs selected Lugo from the Royals in the minor league phase of the Rule 5 draft.

In 2019, between Class A+ and Class AA he was 7-3 with a 3.62 ERA.

International baseball
Lugo was selected as a member of the Italy national baseball team at the 2017 World Baseball Classic. He also played for Team Italy at the 2019 European Baseball Championship. He is playing for the team at the Africa/Europe 2020 Olympic Qualification tournament, taking place in Italy beginning September 18, 2019.

See also
Rule 5 draft results

References

External links

1994 births
2016 European Baseball Championship players
2017 World Baseball Classic players
2019 European Baseball Championship players
Arizona League Indians players
Baseball pitchers
Cardenales de Lara players
Dominican Summer League Indians players
Venezuelan expatriate baseball players in the Dominican Republic
Lake County Captains players
Living people
Lynchburg Hillcats players
Mahoning Valley Scrappers players
Akron RubberDucks players
Northwest Arkansas Naturals players
Venezuelan expatriate baseball players in the United States
Myrtle Beach Pelicans players
Tennessee Smokies players
Iowa Cubs players
Parma Baseball Club players
Sportspeople from Barquisimeto